Leo Juhani "Leksa" Kinnunen (5 August 1943 – 26 July 2017) was a Finnish racing driver, and the first Formula One driver from Finland.

Kinnunen won the Nordic Challenge Cup in 1969, the Interserie from 1971–1973, and helped Porsche to take the World Sportscar Championship for manufacturers in 1970 (drivers championships were not awarded until 1981). In 1974, he switched to Formula One, but in addition to the problems with the underpowered Surtees TS16, his team soon ran into financial problems. He was the last driver to compete in Formula One using an open-face helmet.

Early career

Kinnunen started his racing career on motorcycles, but switched to four wheels after receiving his driver's license in the early 1960s. He quickly gained success in rallying, autocross and ice racing. He finished runner-up in the Finnish Rally Championship and matched the points total of the winner Simo Lampinen. Kinnunen also participated in the Finnish F3 Championship with an outdated Brabham in 1967, and a Titan which he drove to several victories in 1968, including one at Ahvenisto Race Circuit in which he managed to beat Swedish future Formula One star Ronnie Peterson.

International breakthrough
In 1969, Kinnunen made a complete switch to circuit racing and won the Nordic Challenge Cup, predecessor of the popular Interserie, with two wins and a second place at Keimola Motor Stadium after a close battle with Jochen Rindt. He was then invited to test a Porsche 917 at Österreichring and made such an impression that he was hired to partner Pedro Rodriguez in the World Sportscar Championship. The pair surprised the racing world by winning the first race, 24 Hours of Daytona, and went on to win the overall championship for Porsche. For Kinnunen, however, this was unsatisfying time. The car was built for Rodriguez' measurements and driving style, and after Kinnunen managed to quickly outpace him with his own set-ups, he wasn't allowed to modify the car to suit his style anymore. His chance to shine finally came at Targa Florio with the new Porsche 908/03 as Rodriguez was ill on the race day. On the final lap of the race, Kinnunen set a time of 33'36min, breaking the old lap record by 1½ minutes. This is still the fastest ever time recorded for the Sicilian road circuit.

Interserie
Kinnunen then moved on to drive Porsche 917 for Finnish AAW Racing Team in the Interserie. He won the championship in his debut year, despite withdrawing from the race at Norisring after seeing his former team-mate Rodriguez crash into the barriers and lose his life. He eventually went on to win the championship three times in a row, in 1971, 1972 and 1973, with a total of 18 heat and 11 outright wins. In 1973, he also participated in the World Rally Championship event 23rd 1000 Lakes Rally and finished third with his Porsche Carrera, behind Timo Mäkinen and Markku Alén.

Formula One
Kinnunen was close to moving to Formula One already for the 1971 season. With the help of Jochen Rindt he was negotiating for a race seat with Team Lotus, which was dominating the series at the time and eventually won the World Constructors' Championship that season. After Rindt's sudden death at Monza, the negotiations came to a halt. According to Kinnunen, Bernie Ecclestone wanted him to drive for free. Kinnunen turned down the offer and demanded a wage for his services, as he was a professional racer.

In 1974, Kinnunen was looking for a job and John Surtees offered him one of his new Formula One cars, Surtees TS16, on lease. Kinnunen accepted the offer since the Surtees TS14 had done well the previous season. After finally finding sponsorship, Kinnunen entered the series with a new team and a Cosworth DFV V8 3.0 litre engine. Antti Aarnio-Wihuri allowed the team to use the AAW Racing Team name, which was recognized and had a good reputation in racing circles.

AAW Racing's first Grand Prix at Nivelles turned out to be a disaster. The TS16 arrived in time for the race weekend, but Kinnunen had never even sat in the car before. It also turned out that the car had been used as a mobile testbed by the factory, and it already had a damaged monocoque and rear suspension. On top of that, it was 80 kilos overweight, the engine lacked power and the team was not allowed to get the top quality tires used by the top teams. When Kinnunen took the car on track, its gearbox broke after three laps. The team, consisting of only three mechanics, had no spare parts and repair work turned out to be unsuccessful, as the gearbox broke again in qualifying, leaving Kinnunen without a recorded time and the only driver not to qualify for the race.

After Nivelles, the team concentrated on testing and fixing the car. They did not travel to Monaco but entered the next race in Sweden. Kinnunen qualified 25th, and while usually only 24 drivers would be allowed to start, Kinnunen's good standing within the Swedish motorsport circle meant an exception was made for him and he was allowed to start.

The AAW team knew that the car would not last the whole race, so they fueled it for only ten laps in order to make a quick press run. This compensated for the TS16's heavy weight, and Kinnunen managed to overtake five cars in eight laps before a spark plug problem forced him to retire. Kinnunen later stated that a spark plug thread in the cylinder head had been stripped prior to the race. A Ferrari mechanic had loaned them a threaded insert kit to fix it, but a mechanic inadvertently damaged the threads while installing the plug and it never seated properly.

The rest of the season did not go well for the team either. They were not allowed to take part in the Dutch Grand Prix, and failed to qualify for the races in France, Great Britain, Italy or Austria. Lack of funding then forced the team to retire from Formula One.

Later career

After his short stint in Formula One, Kinnunen went back to the Interserie for the series' last event in Hockenheim. He won both heats, and placed sixth overall in the championship just for the points from this race. Kinnunen was then hired by Martini Racing to drive a Porsche 908 Turbo in the World Sportscar Championship in 1975. Partnered with Herbert Müller, his best result of the season was third at Nürburgring. In 1976, he switched teams and raced a Porsche 934 Turbo with Egon Evertz. They managed to collect three podium places and the highlight of the season was a second place at Watkins Glen. After the season the team quit in racing due to financial problems. Kinnunen quit his circuit racing career in 1977, but still raced in a few rally events in Finland, winning the 1979 Arctic Rally. He remained in the sport in administration and lived in Turku.

Kinnunen was asked to drive in the film Le Mans personally by actor and racing enthusiast Steve McQueen, who himself drove for Porsche in North America. Kinnunen's contract with Porsche did not allow the performance and he was replaced by David Piper, who was severely injured during the filming.

Racing record

Complete Formula One World Championship results
(key)

Complete WRC results

Complete 24 Hours of Le Mans results

Other results in track racing (not Formula 1 or Le Mans)

Complete Rally results (including WRC races mentioned before)

References

External links

Leo Kinnunen – The Flying Finn 

1943 births
2017 deaths
Sportspeople from Tampere
Finnish racing drivers
Finnish Formula One drivers
Finnish rally drivers
24 Hours of Le Mans drivers
24 Hours of Daytona drivers
World Sportscar Championship drivers